In mathematics, topological degree theory is a generalization of the winding number of a curve in the complex plane. It can be used to estimate the number of solutions of an equation, and is closely connected to fixed-point theory. When one solution of an equation is easily found, degree theory can often be used to prove existence of a second, nontrivial, solution. There are different types of degree for different types of maps: e.g.  for maps between Banach spaces there is the Brouwer degree in Rn, the Leray-Schauder degree for compact mappings in normed spaces, the coincidence degree and various other types. There is also a degree for continuous maps between manifolds. 

Topological degree theory has applications in complementarity problems, differential equations, differential inclusions and dynamical systems.

Further reading
Topological fixed point theory of multivalued mappings, Lech Górniewicz, Springer, 1999, 
Topological degree theory and applications, Donal O'Regan, Yeol Je Cho, Yu Qing Chen, CRC Press, 2006, 
Mapping Degree Theory, Enrique Outerelo, Jesus M. Ruiz, AMS Bookstore, 2009, 

Topology
Algebraic topology
Differential topology